Manthorpe is a village in the South Kesteven district of Lincolnshire, England. It is on the northern edge of the town of Grantham and on the Grantham to Lincoln A607 road, between the East Coast Main Line and the River Witham. The village is part of the civil parish of Belton and Manthorpe.

History
Before the 19th century, Manthorpe parish was agricultural and known as Little Gonerby-cum-Manthorpe. The Grantham to Lincoln road followed what is now Low Road, across the river behind Swallow's Mill, through Belton Park and along the old route to the Roman town of Ancaster on the Ermine Street Roman Road.

In 1810 the Brownlow family, owners of Belton Park and House just north of Manthorpe, built a new road from Grantham to Belton. In the 1840s and 1850s new houses, a church and school were built, and established properties were renovated.

The Church of England parish church of St John the Evangelist was designed by architect George Gordon Place of Nottingham and built in 1847–48. It was built as an estate church by the Brownlow family to serve Belton Estate workers.

The 1885 Kelly's Directory describes Manthorpe as "a small and pleasant village". It was an ecclesiastical district established in 1849 from the civil parish of Grantham and the village formed a township with Little Gonerby. It was within the Grantham parliamentary borough, the rural deanery of North Grantham, and the archdeaconry and Diocese of Lincoln. Manthorpe's church of St John the Evangelist, consecrated by the Bishop of Lincoln in 1848, is in early Decorated style. The church, graveyard and parsonage sites were provided by Earl Brownlow, who also paid for construction of the parsonage. The earl's brother, Richard Cust, St John's Rector in 1885, built the church at his own expense. Bequests from the brothers provided the living – a vicarage united with that of Londonthorpe. The parish register dates from 1849, but earlier records for Manthorpe appear in Grantham registers.

Kelly's describes the area as being skirted on the north by a formation of blue lias, and on the south by oolite, with land being of sand with a gravel subsoil. Chief crops grown were wheat, barley, oats and turnips, in a township area of  that included Little Gonerby. In 1881 the ecclesiastical district contained a population of 243, and the Manthorpe-cum-Little Gonerby township, 3,567. An infants school for 50 children, with an average attendance of 30, was erected in 1865 with financial support from Earl Brownlow. Township occupations included four farmers, two cow-keepers, a grazier, a wheelwright, three shopkeepers, and a miller at Manthorpe Mill, a watermill.

In the early 20th century, houses began to be connected to electricity, with others supplied with water by a village pump or their own well. Eventually the Brownlow estate connected water and electricity to all households.

By the late 1940s there were about a dozen houses west of Manthorpe Road, with the village still separated from Grantham. During the 1950s and 1960s houses were built west of Manthorpe Road and on the side of the River Witham. In the 1960s Grantham became conjoined to the village after the Manthorpe housing estate was built on the north side of the town. When the 6th Lord Brownlow died, in 1978, further land became available and most cottages in Manthorpe village were sold.

Community
The nearest schools are situated on the Manthorpe estate in Grantham. These are The Priory Ruskin Academy, (formerly the Central Technology & Sports College), a mixed-sex secondary school on Rushcliffe Road, and Cliffedale Primary School on Northcliffe Road.

The ecclesiastical parish is the benefice of Grantham Manthorpe, of the Deanery of Grantham. The Vicar of Manthorpe since 2014 is Fr Stuart Cradduck, who is also the Rector of St Wulfram's, Grantham.

The nearest shop is a convenience store on the corner of Sandcliffe Road and Rushcliffe Road, on the Manthorpe estate. The closest supermarkets are in Grantham. Manthorpe has its own Residents' Association.

References

External links

Priory Ruskin Academy
Cliffedale Primary School

Grantham
South Kesteven District
Villages in Lincolnshire